The University of Science and Technology of Ivory Coast is a private university in West Africa whose headquarters are located in the district of Plateau in Abidjan, the economic capital of Ivory Coast.

History

Created by a group of teachers-researchers, including Professor Frédéric Dohou, the "Université des Sciences et Technologies de Côte d'Ivoire" is a university institution for scientific, cultural and professional character, enjoying corporate personality, pedagogical and scientific, administrative and financial autonomy. 
It contributes to the missions of higher education and scientific research through five Faculties and one University Institute for Technology.

The UST-CI is a member institution of the Network of Universities of Science and Technology of the Countries of Africa south of the Sahara.

Organization
The UST-CI has five faculties, one university institute for technology and one research center:

List of Faculties
Faculty of Legal, Administrative and Political
Faculty of Economics
Faculty of Management Sciences
Faculty of Fundamental and Applied Sciences
Faculty of Letters, Arts and Social Sciences

Institute
University Institute for Technology

Research Centre
 Consortium for the Management of Basic and Applied Research in Africa south of the Sahara

References

External links 
  

Universities in Ivory Coast
Organizations based in Abidjan
Educational institutions established in 2009
Buildings and structures in Abidjan
2009 establishments in Ivory Coast